The Sea Urchin is a 1926 British drama film directed by Graham Cutts and starring Betty Balfour, George Hackathorne and W. Cronin Wilson. It was made at Gainsborough Studios with Michael Balcon as producer.

Cast
 Betty Balfour - Fay Wynchbeck 
 George Hackathorne - Jack Trebarrow 
 W. Cronin Wilson - Rivoli 
 Haidee Wright - Minnie Wynchbeck 
 Marie Wright - Mary Wynchbeck 
 Cecil Morton York - Sir Trevor Trebarrow 
 Clifford Heatherley - Sullivan 
 A.G. Poulton - Janitor

References

External links

1926 films
1926 drama films
Films directed by Graham Cutts
British black-and-white films
British silent feature films
Gainsborough Pictures films
British drama films
1920s English-language films
1920s British films
Silent drama films